Somersault is an acrobatic exercise in which a person does a full 360° flip.

Somersault may also refer to:

 Somersault (Chicane album), 2007
 Somersault (Eggstone album), 1994
 Somersault (Beach Fossils album), 2017
 Somersault (film), a 2004 Australian independent film
 Somersault (novel), a novel by Kenzaburō Ōe
 "Somersault" (song), a 2004 song by Zero 7 featuring Sia